Ragnarok is a Norwegian fantasy drama streaming television series reimagining of Norse mythology from Netflix. It takes place in the present-day fictional Norwegian town of Edda in Hordaland, which is plagued by climate change and industrial pollution caused by factories owned by the local Jutul family. The Jutuls are actually four Jötunn (supernatural beings) posing as a family. They are challenged by Magne, a teenage boy who is surprised to learn that he is the reincarnation of Thor, the Norse god of thunder. He begins to fight against those who are destroying the town after his friend dies under mysterious circumstances. In the second season, he is joined by more people who embody other Norse gods.

The series premiered in January 2020, with a second season released in May 2021. It is Netflix's third Norwegian-language TV series, following Home for Christmas and Lilyhammer. The series is produced by the Danish production company SAM Productions.

In November 2021, Herman Tømmeraas, who plays Fjor, confirmed that the series will return for a third season, which will wrap up the story.

Cast and characters

Main
 David Stakston as Magne Seier, returns to Edda as a high school student. The reincarnation of Thor, god of thunder.
  as Laurits Seier, Magne's younger half-brother, and Vidar's son. He is the reincarnation and reimaging of Loki, god of mischief.
 Herman Tømmeraas as Fjor, high-school-age "son" in the Jutul family of giants from Norse mythology.
  as Saxa, the high-school-aged "daughter" in the Jutul family.
  as Gry, Magne's and Fjor's love interest.
 Henriette Steenstrup as Turid Seier, Magne's and Laurits' mother, wife of Asbjorn.
 Synnøve Macody Lund as Ran, principal of the high school and "mother" in the Jutul family.
 Gísli Örn Garðarsson as Vidar, CEO of Jutul Industries, "father" in the Jutul family, and Laurits' biological father.

Supporting
 Ylva Bjørkås Thedin as Isolde Eidsvoll, Magne's green activist friend.
 Odd-Magnus Williamson as Erik Eidsvoll, Isolde's father, teacher at the high school.
 Bjørn Sundquist as Wotan Wagner, elderly disabled aged care resident. The reincarnation of Odin, god of wisdom and king of the gods.
  as Wenche, supermarket checkout operator. Her real identity is Völva. She awakens Magne's, Iman's and Wotan's powers.
 Tani Dibasey as Oscar Bjørnholt, high school student, hangs out with Fjor.
  as Yngvild Bjørnholt, local police chief, Oscar's mother.
 Danu Sunth as Iman Reza, new high school student. The reincarnation of Freyja, goddess of love, who can manipulate minds.
 Billie Barker as Signy, Magne's new love interest.
 Benjamin Helstad as Harry, mechanic, boxer. The reincarnation of Týr, god of war.
 Espen Sigurdsen as Halvor Lange, doctor at nursing home, "dark elf" or dwarven blacksmith.
 Fridtjov Såheim as Sindre, high school counselor.

Episodes

Season 1 (2020)

Season 2 (2021)

Season 3 (2023)

Reception
The series holds a rating of 7.5 on IMDb. Wired said Ragnarok was "angsty, eccentric" "climate change fiction" and compared it to Twilight. The A.V. Club also compared it to Twilight.

The series was not well received by some Norwegian media. VG called it nonsensical, said that the characters, plots, and dialogue were a failure, and noted that even though it was in Norwegian that it felt more like a Danish series. Despite being set in Western Norway, the characters do not speak in western dialect. Dagbladet called it a stilted mixture of Skam and Norse mythology, "just as bad as it sounds". Filmdagbok made a point of it being superficial and politically boring.

Glowing reviews were also posted, including a Rotten Tomatoes viewer score of 81%, and IGN's K. Campbell praising Ragnarok as "compelling" and citing "the strength of its central concept, which depicts the end of the world as a slow creep..."

See also

References

External links 
 
 
 
 

Norwegian-language Netflix original programming
2020 Norwegian television series debuts
Fantasy television series
Teen superhero television series
Superhero web series
Television series about teenagers
Television series based on Norse mythology
2020s Norwegian television series
Television shows set in Norway
Television series by StudioCanal